George Zino Voyiadjis is an American civil engineer. He has been on the faculty of Louisiana State University in Baton Rouge, Louisiana, since 1980, and is Boyd Professor and Bingham C. Stewart Distinguished Professor in its department of civil and environmental engineering. He specializes in mechanics of materials and damage mechanics, and the numerical modeling thereof.

Education 

Voyiadjis took a B.Sc. in civil engineering from Ain Shams University in Cairo in 1969, an M.Sc. in civil engineering from California Institute of Technology in Pasadena in 1970, and a D.Eng.Sc. in engineering mechanics from Columbia University in New York in 1973.

Books 

 with Peter Issa Kattan: Advances in Damage Mechanics: Metals and Metal Matrix Composites. Amsterdam: Elsevier, 1999. ; second edition 2006. 
 with Peter Issa Kattan: Damage Mechanics with Finite Elements: Practical Applications with Computer Tools. Berlin; Heidelberg; New York: Springer, 2001. . 
 with Peter Issa Kattan: Mechanics of Composite Materials with MATLAB. Berlin; Heidelberg; New York: Springer, 2005 .
 with Peter Issa Kattan: Damage Mechanics. Boca Raton: Taylor & Francis, 2005. .
 with Chung R. Song: The Coupled Theory of Mixtures in Geomechanics with Applications, 2006. Berlin; Heidelberg; New York: Springer. 
 with Pawel Woelke: Elasto-Plastic and Damage Analysis of Plates and Shells, 2008. Berlin; Heidelberg; New York: Springer. . 
 with Mohammadreza Yaghoobi: Size Effects in Plasticity, 2019. London; San Diego, CA: Elsevier. .
 with Yooseob Song: Gradient-enhanced Continuum Plasticity: Theories, Experiments and Numerical Methods, 2020. Amsterdam: Elsevier. .

References

Living people
1946 births
Louisiana State University faculty
California Institute of Technology alumni
Ain Shams University alumni
Columbia School of Engineering and Applied Science alumni